CoNETS (Connecting to the Next Education for Teachers and Students) is a consortium established in September 2013 by 12 textbook publishers and Hitachi Solutions to promote digital textbooks for primary and secondary schools in Japan.

Members 
The consortium consists of 13 companies. They are Dainippon Tosho, Jikkyo Shuppan, Kairyudo, Sanseido, Kyoiku Geijyutusha, Mitsumura Tosho, Teikoku-Shoin, Taishukan Publishing, Keirinkan, Yamakawa Shuppansha, Suken Shuppan, Nihon Bunkyou Shuppan and Hitachi Solutions.

The consortium began developing a virtual distribution platform for textbooks. The adopted data format for the platform is EPUB 3.

Chronology

 September 5, 2013: Established.
 December 20, 2013: A prototype began testing at Ritsumeikan Primary School.
 May 21, 2014: A prototype was demonstrated at the fifth EDIX (Educational IT Solutions Expo).
 September 17, 2014: A prototype was demonstrated at EDUPUB Tokyo 2014.

References

External links 

  

Education in Japan
2013 establishments in Japan